This is a summary of notable incidents that have taken place at various European amusement parks, water parks, or theme parks. This list is not intended to be a comprehensive list of every such event, but only those that have a significant impact on the parks or park owners, or are otherwise significantly newsworthy.

The term incidents refers to major accidents, injuries, deaths that occur at a European park. While these incidents were required to be reported to regulatory authorities due to where they occurred, they usually fall into one of the following categories:
Caused by negligence on the part of the guest. This can be refusal to follow specific ride safety instructions, or deliberate intent to break park rules.
The result of a guest's known, or unknown, health issues.
Negligence on the part of the park, either by ride operator or maintenance.
Act of God or a generic accident (e.g., slipping and falling), that is not a direct result of an action on anybody's part.

Alton Towers, Staffordshire, England

Congo River Rapids 

 In 1999, a park employee nearly drowned after he slipped and became stuck between a raft and a turntable that powered the ride.

Oblivion 

 On 8 May 2012, a 20-year-old man entered a restricted area of the ride and walked into the tunnel. He was rescued and then arrested by the police. The ride resumed operation shortly after.

Sky Ride 
 On 30 June 2004, due to a strong gust of wind, the Sky Ride cables became caught, jamming the ride. About 80 people were on the ride, and nine people had to be rescued by being abseiled down  cables.
 During the 2007 Scarefest season, a fire broke out in the Forbidden Valley section of the park due to a halogen lamp that damaged the roof and mechanics of the ride. The damage was repairable, but the ride had to be closed for six months before reopening midway through the 2008 season. Fortunately, nobody was harmed.
 The Sky Ride suffered another fire on 21 July 2009 in The Towers section of the park, due to a faulty vending machine. The fire completely destroyed the whole station. Over the following season, the station was rebuilt, and was ready for the 2010 season.

Runaway Mine Train 

 On 20 July 2006, when the train was entering the tunnel section of its course, the train split into two halves, leaving the rear part behind with the front part continuing up the hill. The front half of the train failed to make it over the slope, rolled back into the tunnel, and collided with the rear half. Six people were taken to hospital, including two women with leg injuries, and 23 others were treated for cuts and bruises. Following the incident, the ride was closed for eight months and reopened in April 2007.

The Smiler 

On 2 November 2013, four people were injured after being hit by flying guide wheels when they fell off one of the trains.
Four passengers — two male, two female, aged between 17 and 27 — suffered serious leg injuries and were airlifted to nearby hospitals for treatment. One of the casualties had to have her left leg amputated due to her injuries while a second casualty had to have her right leg amputated due to the extent of her injuries. A fifth person with neck and abdominal injuries was also taken to hospital. The other 11 riders were believed to have only minor injuries and received medical treatment at the scene. This has been stated to be the biggest incident to ever occur at Alton Towers. The theme park was closed until 7 June 2015 pending the completion of the investigation. Ride staff operating The Smiler at the time of the incident were investigated, after reports that it was manually restarted in similar fashion to the Alton mouse during its incident in 1991, however the criminal investigation concluded that the crash was not caused by individual staff error. This accident also caused Spinball Whizzer and three other roller coasters at sister parks Thorpe Park and Chessington World of Adventures to close until safety procedures were evaluated; these rides reopened shortly afterwards. The Smiler reopened on 19 March 2016. Merlin Attractions Operations Ltd was prosecuted at North Staffordshire Justice Centre on 22 April 2016, in which the firm pleaded guilty, and was subsequently fined £5 million on 27 September 2016 after a two-day hearing at Stafford Crown Court. Victims are suing Alton Towers in the civil courts.

Battersea Park Funfair, Wandsworth, London England

Roller coaster ride

 On 30 May 1972, one of the train cars on the roller coaster started to climb the cable hill when the cable suddenly snapped. With there being no anti-rollback device on this attraction, the train rolled back into the station colliding with the other train. Five children were killed and thirteen others injured. The ride (the park's main attraction) was permanently closed, leading to the funfair's commercial decline and its eventual closure at the end of the 1974 season.

Blackpool Pleasure Beach, Lancashire, England

Avalanche
On 28 August 1994, ten people suffered minor injuries when one of the coaster trains collided into another parked at the station. All were treated at a local hospital.
 In 1997, the train jumped on the brakes, causing it to crash into itself. One boy was taken to hospital with bruised ribs. This incident was shown on the BBC TV documentary about Blackpool Pleasure Beach in 1998.

Big Dipper
On 11 August 2009, two trains carrying a total of 32 guests collided, resulting in 21 guests requiring treatment at a nearby hospital for injuries ranging from whiplash and broken noses, to cuts and bruises.

Big One
 On 31 August 2000, 23 people were injured, when two trains collided due to a failure of the ride's braking system.
 On 14 June 2011, a train stopped abruptly, causing minor injuries to its occupants. One person was reported to be hospitalised with whiplash injury.

Grand National
In May 2004, due to an electrical fault, the entire ride station, along with parts of two other rides, were completely destroyed by a fire. Firefighters used water from the nearby Valhalla ride to put the fire out. The Grand National's station was rebuilt, and the ride reopened on 28 October 2004 after all repairs were completed.
On 24 October 2014, a 58-year-old man broke his neck whilst riding the Grand National with his 13-year-old nephew. Upon returning to the station, he was found slumped in the carriage and was rushed to Royal Preston Hospital.

Space Invader 2
 On 21 July 2000, an 11-year-old boy died after falling out of a ride vehicle on the Space Invader roller coaster. Reports say that he may have panicked on the dark ride and unfastened his seatbelt. As a result of the accident, the ride was closed and carriages were re-fitted with over the head restraints. The ride opened after a short hiatus as Space Invader 2.

Bridlington Bayside Fun Park, Bridlington, England

Jungle River Log Flume
 On 29 August 2011, a 58-year-old woman sustained severe leg injuries when the Jungle River Log Flume became stuck and jolted, throwing her out of the cabin. She was riding with her four-year-old granddaughter when the accident happened. It is believed that the ride stalled as it didn't have enough water in it. The granddaughter was taken to hospital with minor bruising. In July 2017, the ride was replaced by a ferris wheel due to the accident.

Botton's Amusement Park, Skegness, England

Surf Rider
 On 30 August 2011 at 3:15pm, emergency services were called to the ride after reports that the arm had collapsed. Firefighters used ropes and ladders to rescue the 22 passengers who had become lodged at a 90 degree angle. Seven passengers were injured and taken to hospital, including one woman with life-threatening head injuries. It was reported that the ride had had maintenance done in the previous few days.

Brighton Palace Pier, Brighton, East Sussex, England

Air Race
On 8 April 2019, a teenage boy got a leg injury from being hit by a piece of the ride that came loose.

Camelot Theme Park, Lancashire, England

Excalibur 2
On 23 August 2011, a 12-year-old boy fell from the ride. Witnesses say the boy clung to the ride until he fell .

The Gauntlet
 On 22 October 2001, a 59-year-old employee was killed as he was struck by a train when he was performing maintenance on the ride. Prime Resorts Limited was fined £40,000 and ordered to pay £20,000 costs, after a court decided the death was caused by fundamental management errors.

Chessington World of Adventures, London, England

Tomb Blaster 

On 7 June 2012, a 4-year-old girl fell from an elevated walkway used as the queue for the Tomb Blaster attraction. She suffered broken ribs, a cracked skull, and brain hemorrhage after falling  through a hole in the wooden fencing. On Friday 9 January 2015, Chessington plead guilty to the incident labeling it a result of improper maintenance. H&S investigators said the fall happened as a result of water from the roof dripping onto the paneling, rotting the wood. On Monday 12 January 2015, Chessington World of Adventures Operations Ltd. was fined £150,000 as a result of the fall. Operator Merlin Entertainments apologised and said that they had since spent millions on remedial work across the park to ensure something  similar could never occur again. One improvement made involved adding a steel rail fence to the Tomb Blaster queue.

Coney Beach Pleasure Park, Porthcawl, Wales

Water Chute
On 1 April 1994, a 9-year-old boy was killed after being flung off the 58-year-old "Water Chute" ride when a steel hoop collapsed in wet and windy conditions and fell onto the open-topped carriage in which he was travelling.

Drayton Manor Resort, Staffordshire, England

Maelstrom 
On 3 August 2012, a 42-year-old woman collapsed and died of a heart attack after coming off the Maelstrom ride. It has been stated that the woman was on a day out with her 14-year-old daughter, who later posted on Facebook "RIP Momma, I love you".

Splash Canyon
On 9 May 2017, an 11-year-old girl fell out of a raft on the Splash Canyon Rapids ride. She then climbed an 'algae-covered travellator' before slipping and falling into a deeper pool of water where she drowned. According to Drayton Manor's director, George Bryan, park staff responded immediately and rescued the girl from the water. The girl was airlifted to Birmingham Children's Hospital, but was proclaimed dead from her drowning soon after arrival. The park was temporarily closed after the incident, and the ride remained closed until summer 2021. The same updated restrictions were applied to adjacent water ride Stormforce 10.

Energylandia Lesser, Zator, Poland

Hyperion 

 On 16 August 2018, a 37-year-old employee of the park was hit by a train on the Hyperion roller coaster when picking up a cell phone, which had been dropped in the station by one of the guests. Shortly after he died due to the injuries.

Europa Park, Rust, Germany

Euro-Mir 

 In July 2004, a power failure caused the brake on one of the gondolas to release prematurely, causing it to collide with another gondola at low speed. One rider broke his leg, while others were reported to have received cervical spine syndrome as a result of the incident.
 In August 2013, another incident occurred when a man freed himself from the ride's safety bar. The man fell onto an escape route running alongside the rails and injured his leg, but was otherwise unharmed.

Poseidon 
On 31 May 2005, shortly before 12:30 p.m., the victim and a friend climbed into the back seat of an eight-seater boat on the Poseidon. The retaining brackets closed properly, as shown in the pictures. After the start, the boats of the "Poseidon" water coaster are pulled diagonally upwards to a height of about 20 metres. According to witnesses, the heavy man suddenly panicked, pushed out with all his might against the retaining bracket and squeezed himself under it. Even his companion sitting next to him and the other passengers in the boat could no longer prevent him from climbing out of the slow-moving train. The 44-year-old fell into a pond overgrown with school, which is outside the generally accessible visitor area. An emergency doctor could only determine the death of the man. The passengers who were still in the boat and those accompanying the dead man received psychological care as a precaution. The accident went largely unnoticed by the other guests of the park.

Arthur 
During work on the not yet opened new for 2014 attraction "Arthur in the Kingdom of Minimoys" in Europa-Park, there was an accident in which two employees of a third-party company for ropes and nets were hit by a roller coaster car. One of the two workers suffered life-threatening injuries and later succumbed to his injuries in hospital. The two workers were working near the roller coaster on a lifting platform. During the work, the attraction is said to have been in test operation, and several roller coaster cars drove past the workers. Eventually, both were hit by a car, police said. It remains unclear why the workers stayed in the restricted area near the track during the test operation despite warnings (loudspeaker announcements), clearly violating the safety regulations.

Pirates of Batavia
 On Saturday, 26 May 2018, a large fire destroyed the ride and parts of the Dutch- and Scandinavian-themed areas. Seven first responders suffered smoke inhalation. No visitors were injured, as the park evacuated 25,000 guests. The ride later reopened in July 2020.

Flamingo Land, North Yorkshire, England

Dino Roller
On 5 August 2020, a park employee was taken to hospital after suffering injuries to his legs while trying to repair the ride. His injuries were not considered to have been life-threatening despite having been serious.

Hero
On 22 May 2015, a 15-year-old girl and a 26-year-old woman were injured after a footrail dislodged while in motion and landed in the queue for the ride. The 15-year-old girl was taken to Scarborough General Hospital where she received treatment for her head injuries, whereas the 26-year-old woman was treated at the scene. Although both sustained head injuries, North Yorkshire Police released a statement claiming that neither was life-threatening. The ride was taken out of operation in accordance with Flamingo Land's operational procedures, and underwent a full inspection in conjunction with North Yorkshire Police and the HSE (Health and Safety Executive). The ride has since reopened with nets above the waiting line to catch any falling items, and is in full operation.

Gardaland, Northern Italy

Mr. Ping's Noodle Surprise
On 26 December 2016, a 6-year-old girl suffered head injuries while riding in the rotating teacups. She was hospitalized at Borgo Trento Hospital in Verona.

Gray's Amusement Park, Ingoldmells, England
On 2 June 2000, a 12-year-old boy died as a result of injuries sustained at Gray's Amusement Park in Ingoldmells near Skegness. He was hit in the chest by a manual swing, known as The Swinging Gym. The incident was described as a tragic accident.

Gulliver's Land, Milton Keynes, England

On 17 May 2006, a 56-year-old park employee was performing safety checks on the train when his head hit on a bridge as the train dragged him through a tunnel, decapitating him.

Gulliver's World, Warrington, England

Ferris Wheel
On 13 July 2002, a 15-year-old girl with Down syndrome fell  from a Ferris wheel. The teenager was taken to hospital, but died two days later from her injuries. The park was fined a total of £80,000 for failing to ensure a person's safety, and not carrying out risk assessments.

Crazy Train

Guillena Zoo, near Seville, Spain

Flying Swinger
On 9 April 2005, 18 people were injured when a Flying Swinger ride collapsed at Guillena Zoo near Seville, Spain. Out of all the 18 injured, 15 were children. Four were seriously injured, including an 11-year-old girl and a woman, who were airlifted to a hospital in Seville, after sustaining serious head and leg injuries. Witnesses said that the attraction's main support snapped in two, trapping victims under the debris. The ride, built in 2001, had just passed all of its required safety inspections.

Holiday Park, Haßloch, Germany

Spinning Barrels
On 15 August 2014, an 11-year-old girl was killed after being run over by several gondolas. The girl entered the ride via an unlocked door. When an employee turned on the ride and did not notice the girl was not inside the gondola, the girl tripped and fell. An employee of the park was sentenced to a fine of €2,400 for negligent homicide. After the incident, the ride was closed and sold.

Landmark Forest Adventure Park, Carrbridge, Scotland

Runaway Timber Train
On 12 August 2021, two children sustained minor injuries after two carriages on the Runaway Timber Train rollercoaster derailed.

Lightwater Valley, North Yorkshire, England

The Twister
 A 20-year-old woman died on 21 June 2001 following an accident the previous day when two carriages on the Twister roller coaster collided. Police decided not to prosecute a maintenance worker, who claimed that he had only received an hour's training on that ride and had not seen its manual. Faulty wiring had also caused a malfunction on the ride. In October 2004, the deputy coroner ruled death by misadventure. On 14 November 2006, the park was charged with failing to ensure the health and safety of riders, and the ride operator was charged with failing to ensure safety through his work. Both pleaded guilty. The ride manufacturer, Reverchon Industries SA, was convicted of two charges of failing to ensure the ride's safe design and construction.
 On 30 May 2019, a 7-year-old boy fell from a ride carriage and suffered head injuries. The child was later airlifted to Leeds General Infirmary and fully recovered. After the accident, the ride was shut down for the rest of the 2019 season and was later sold.

Black Pearl
 On 14 July 2016, a 55-year-old man nearly fell  from his seat off the ride after his safety restraints were unlocked. His carer rescued him by grabbing onto his wrists.

The Ultimate
 On 29 September 2014, a deer was killed instantly after being hit by an ongoing coaster train. Passengers were covered in blood at the scene, but no one suffered any serious injuries sustained during the accident. A similar incident occurred in June 1994 as another was decapitated by the roller coaster when it stumbled onto the tracks which caused a 12-year-old boy to become injured and taken to a nearby hospital for treatment.

Liseberg, Gothenburg, Sweden

Lisebergbanan

 On 15 July 2006, 21 people were injured when two trains on the Lisebergbanan rollercoaster collided. The crash happened when the chain that pulls trains up the initial climb malfunctioned, causing a fully loaded train to roll backward into the loading platform, hitting another train that was unloading riders. Since only part of the train was on the lift, the anti-rollback mechanism had not fully engaged and broke. Since the accident the roller coaster has opened again, after a technical adjustment and is in full operation.

Flumeride
 On 8 October 2006, a woman in her thirties was seriously injured on the Flumeride log boat ride. At the second and final drop, a  slope, the woman apparently panicked, and tried to keep the log boat from travelling down the slope by holding onto the railings. She was ejected from the boat into the water and slid down the slope, where she was hit in the head by at least one of the two following log boats. Since she had managed to temporarily keep the log boat from dropping down the slope, the following two log boats passed the last safety gate, and couldn't be stopped from falling down the last slope where the woman was located. The event was witnessed by the staff who stopped the ride, but were unable to prevent two of the log boats from continuing. The woman, who was travelling together with her 11-year-old daughter and another woman, was taken to Sahlgrenska University Hospital, where she was reported to be in critical but stable condition. An investigation has been initiated by the authorities, and Liseberg has also initiated an internal inquiry. She eventually fully recovered.

Rainbow

On 15 July 2008, 30 people were injured when the ride collapsed. The park manager stated that he believes a ball bearing on the ride failed. The ride was dismantled on 17 July 2008. Investigators then confirmed on 19 July 2008 that they had discovered a faulty drive shaft during their inspection. They believed that one of the axles that is designed to hold the passenger carriage horizontal failed. The drive shaft had been replaced by Huss Maschinefabrik, the ride's manufacturer, in 2003.

Loudoun Castle, Ayrshire, Scotland

Rat
On 16 July 2007, an 18-year-old park worker with mild cerebral palsy died after falling  from the Rat ride at the Scottish Park. He was on a day off on 15 July 2007 when it is believed he saw one of the carriages stuck on the ride. He climbed up to attempt to fix the ride; however when it started to move he was dragged to the highest point, when he lost his grip and fell. The park voluntarily closed the ride even after it passed inspection.

Luna Park, St Brieuc, France
 On 10 August 2015, a woman broke her leg after one of the bungee lines snapped on a slingshot-style bungee ride, causing the carriage to hit one of the supporting poles.

M&D's, Motherwell, Scotland

Tsunami
On 4 July 2011, nine people, ranging in age from 9 to 49, had to be rescued from the Tsunami roller coaster, after a mechanical failure on the ride left them stranded 60 ft (18.2m) above the ground for up to eight hours.
On 26 June 2016, the roller coaster derailed, falling into the crowd below, injuring seven children and two adults. On the way down, it hit the main structure and came to rest on a nearby children's ride. Ten park guests were taken to local hospitals for treatment. The park was evacuated following the incident. The ride was dismantled and removed eight months later.

White Water Log Flume
Around 2013, there was an incident on the White Water Log Flume in which a woman's leg was trapped between a barrier and a splashback on the ride's structure, causing a serious injury.
In August 2015, three people were injured when the White Water Log Flume slipped on its track, and later the same month a 58-year-old woman and three teenagers had to walk down from the top of the ride after it stuck at the highest point.

Mirabilandia Savio, Ravenna (RA), Emilia-Romagna, Italy

Katun
 On 28 September 2007, a man was killed at the Mirabilandia theme park in Ravenna, Italy, when he was  hit in the head by the leg of a female rider on the Katun inverted coaster. The girl whose leg struck the man was injured. The man was in a restricted area when he was struck, however the ride was still closed so officials could investigate.

Naudières, Sautron, France

Roller Coaster
 On 13 August 2011, a 24-year-old ride operator was crushed by two trains at the Naudières theme park in Sautron, France. The man left the control booth of the ride whilst it was in motion. He slipped, trapping his legs beneath the track and then was hit by a train, trapping him between two cars, crushing him beneath the ride's structure. Doctors amputated his legs at the scene, but he later died of his injuries. The park closed the next day due to 'very bad weather'.

Nigloland, Dolancourt, France

Bat Coaster
On 4 April 2005, the former golf coaster was stopped by a guest while going into a curve that would naturally slow down the ride. The technician called managed to make the ride work again, but it ended up colliding with the technician's machine, hurting several rider's legs, one seriously. The attraction was closed down and removed from the park afterwards.

Oakwood Theme Park, Pembrokeshire, Wales

Drenched (Hydro)
 On 15 April 2004, a 16-year-old girl from Pontypool was killed after falling approximately 30 m (100 ft) from the top of the Hydro (now called Drenched) ride.  During the Coroner's inquest, the jury returned a narrative verdict stating that the victim died due to not being properly restrained.  In February 2008, Oakwood was charged by the Health and Safety Executive for park staff not ensuring that guests were properly and safely restrained.  On 22 May 2008, magistrates in Haverfordwest magistrates court rejected Oakwood Leisure Limited's request for an adjournment and directed that the hearing should proceed on the assumption of a not guilty plea.  The magistrates declined jurisdiction and adjourned the case which was committed for crown court trial in Swansea Crown Court on 7 July 2008. The magistrates' court was limited to fining the company £20,000, the crown court can impose an unlimited fine. On 8 July 2008, Oakwood plead guilty under the Health and Safety Act 1974 for failing to conduct its business such to ensure that its guests were not exposed to risks. In December 2008 the company was fined £250,000 plus £80,000 in costs.

Treetops
On 23 October 2022, a man suffered serious injuries after being thrown off from one of the carriages which was reported to have become loose during mid-ride. A teenage girl was also injured and both victims were taken to the hospital. Following the incident, the park remained temporarily closed before reopening a week later.

Parc Saint-Paul, Saint Paul, France

Formule 1
On 15 July 2005, a brake failure on the then brand-new coaster caused an incoming train to crash into several others on the brake run, slightly injuring 11 riders.
She died of cardiac arrest some 10 minutes later. An investigation reported that the woman had not followed safety procedures, and thus her death was not declared as a direct result of the park. The coaster reopened some time later.
On 4 July 2020, around 1:45 PM, a 32-year-old woman was ejected from the car mid-ride, and was pronounced dead at the scene. Following an investigation, it was determined that park owner Gilles Campion had deemed the ride's seatbelts unnecessary after the ride passed its November 2019 safety inspection, and subsequently had them removed from the ride vehicles. The ride was scrapped some time after.

Looping
 On 17 August 2005, the front car derailed mid-ride, seriously injuring 4 riders and placing one of them in a coma. The coaster was removed immediately and placed in storage for several years. In 2007, three of the four victims received €6,000  in expenses, and after a lengthy court battle, park owner Gilles Campion was given a suspended 4-month prison sentence and ordered to pay for all damages.

Parko Paliatso, Ayia Napa, Republic of Cyprus

Star Flyer 
On Friday, 12 April 2019, a 7-year-old boy and his 44-year-old mother from Russia were riding the Star Flyer, when their swing collided with a nearby ride resulting in both of them being seriously injured. The boy suffered an exposed fracture on his right leg, while his mother lacerated her left knee, broke her right hand and suffered a concussion. The ride has since been removed from the park.

Parque de Atracciones de Madrid, Madrid, Spain

Tren de la Mina
On 16 July 2017, 33 people were injured when two trains collided with each other as the train they were riding in failed to stop after finishing its run and hit another one which was just about to leave the station. 27 of them were taken to the hospital suffering minor injuries. Paramedics said that six children who were under the age of 10 were also injured in the accident. An emergency service spokesperson said that none of the injuries were considered serious and the guests who were riding have all been treated for neck, back and stomach pains.

Paultons Park, Hampshire, England

Velociraptor
On 26 May 2016, 15 passengers were evacuated from the ride after being stuck  in the air for 40 minutes when it broke down during the morning hours of operation. No injuries were reported.

Phantasialand, Bruhl, Germany

Gebirgsbahn & Grand Canyon Achterbahn
On 1 May 2001, a fire broke out at the park. 54 people were injured during the fire, however no one was seriously hurt. The fire broke out on the powered roller coaster Grand Canyon Achterbahn, located inside the structure of the bigger roller coaster Gebirgsbahn, on a day when the park was filled with 20,000 visitors. The park's founder said a cable fire was most likely the cause of the blaze. There were 150 passengers on the two rides when the fire broke out. Some passengers of the Gebirgsbahn were only able to exit the cars using a  ladder. The mostly polystyrene facade was coated with a fire-resistant film; however, it had lost its effect after years of operation and caught fire. The two roller coasters and the nearby Tanagra Theater were completely destroyed and demolished shortly after. Following this accident, the park improved the safety standards on many of its attractions. This resulted in some compromises. Some of the effects on the park's rides had to be removed, the upper floor of the IMAX simulator Galaxy (later: Race for Atlantis) was permanently closed and the track of the Gondelbahn 1001-Nacht dark ride was shortened to make room for a rescue passage for firetrucks. The park also installed new sprinkler systems in some of the rides like the Silbermine dark ride. Today the rapid river River Quest is located on the site of the two roller coasters. The Tanagra Theater was replaced with the Vekoma Mad House Feng Ju Palace.

Black Mamba
 On 14 May 2011, a 48-year-old man died while riding Black Mamba, an inverted roller coaster. According to German safety inspectors, the roller coaster and all safety features were sound and passed extensive testings by the TÜV. Autopsy showed that the death was caused by a heart attack.

Winja's Fear & Force
On 14 March 2017, a 58-year-old employee fractured his neck while performing maintenance on the ride. He later died from his injuries.

Parc Astérix, Plaily, France

 On 5 July 2006, a 6-year-old Belgian boy drowned as he was dragged underwater by the current. The boy was with a group of friends and supervisors in a boat propelled by rapids, waterfalls and geysers in the attraction 'La Descente du Styx'. It is alleged that the boy stood up too early as the boat reached the end point. Another boat collided with the boy's boat, knocking him into the water. Two people dived in after the boy, but he'd disappeared in the artificial waves of the attraction. When he was found 20 minutes later, resuscitation efforts were of no avail.

Planet Fun, Carrickfergus Castle, Northern Ireland

Star Flyer
Six people were injured on Saturday 24 July 2021 on a ride at a travelling fun fair called Planet Fun. Planet Fun was located at Carrickfergus Castle, Northern Ireland at the time. The ride that malfunctioned at Planet Fun is called ‘Star Flyer’ which spins its occupants in circles as it rises up to 40 ft in the air. The ride swung beyond its perimeter and struck a number of signs belonging to the structure. Six people were injured as a result and were taken to hospital, including three children. A number of people were also treated for injuries at the scene. The incident did not appear to cause any life-threatening injuries. After an investigation by the Health and Safety Executive, it was found that there was "misuse" of equipment by "several teenagers".

PortAventura World, Catalonia, Spain

PortAventura Park

Tomahawk
On 18 May 2009, a 55-year-old park employee died after being run over by a roller coaster train as he was performing maintenance.

Silver River Flume
On 14 September 2018, a 19-year-old man was injured after falling while waiting in line to ride the log flume. He suffered a traumatic cranioencephalic injury and fractured his arms and legs. He was taken to a local hospital for treatment and later recovered.

Pleasureland, Southport. Merseyside, England

Sky Ride
On 25 August 2004, a 59-year-old employee was killed after he became trapped. The park was fined £95,000 for breaching health and safety laws, and were also ordered to pay £50,000 in costs.

Prater, Vienna, Austria

Extasy
 On 5 April 2010, a Viennese man was seriously injured after trying to jump onto a high-speed carousel ride at Vienna's Prater amusement park. The 34-year-old was drunk when he attempted to get back on the ride after it had started by hurling himself at the spinning carousel. He died soon after from multiple life-threatening injuries.
 On 31 October 2018 around 10 p.m. a girl fell out of the spinning gondola of the ride, this resulted in an injured ankle and a bruised armpit, is said that she had a backpack that bloked the full closure of the safety bar

Volare
Three people were injured on the Volare roller coaster on 22 October 2010, when a crane crashed against the ride. The 'wagon' steered into the crane's hoist, set close to the ride. A 21-year-old Macedonian man sustained serious head injuries when he fell  to the ground from the platform supported by the crane. One tourist sustained a broken arm while her friend suffered cuts and bruises. The official accident report says the employee operating the roller coaster was unaware the worker was busy on the scaffolding when he started up the ride. Newspapers, however, report that the attraction has been in operation many times while the painters were busy.

Rotunda Amusement Park, Kent, England

Mini-Dragon
 On 11 September 1999, an 8-year-old girl died after falling from the coaster and hitting her head on a steel support. On 19 February 2003, Dreamland Leisure denied the charge but was found guilty of negligence in ensuring guest safety. The company was fined £25,000 and ordered to pay £140,000 in costs and  £15,000 in compensation to the victim's mother.

Terra Mítica, Benidorm, Spain

Inferno
 On 7 July 2014, a teenager was killed after his harness sprung open on Inferno, a ZacSpin coaster at the park. All other ZacSpins across the world ceased operations pending investigation findings from Terra Mítica and later reopened.

Thorpe Park, Surrey, England

Loggers Leap
 In April 2014, a 14-year-old girl from Colchester was injured by the safety bar. In a subsequent claim against the park's insurers, she was awarded £20,000 for nerve damage, a swollen knee joint, long-term hypersensitivity, and soft tissue damage. The claim stated that the ride attendants put too many guests into the ride vehicle, which forced the victim's legs into the safety barrier. The ride closed in November 2015, and closed permanently in 2019. This was unrelated to the accident.

Rumba Rapids

In the ride's opening year of 1987, a 7-year-old boy was thrown from a boat and lost an ear.  The news was broken by children's BBC TV news programme, Newsround.

X: No Way Out (now The Walking Dead: The Ride)
On 31 August 2000, an 11-year-old boy broke both his legs and was left with slurred speech after suffering a brain injury (left vertebral artery dissection) on the ride caused by falling out of the car.

Vortex
On 15 September 2018, a seat's rear fibreglass cover fell off mid-ride, just missing the riders. The seat was unoccupied (labelled 'Do not use') at the time of the incident. Nobody was injured.

Fire
On 21 July 2000, a fire broke out in the Ranger County area of the park. The fire started at 3pm at Mr. Rabbit's Tropical Travel, quickly spreading to Wicked Witches Haunt. Wicked Witches Haunt was removed and the indoor section of Mr Rabbit's Tropical Travels was destroyed. No one was injured. The cause of the fire is unknown, but sources say that the fire was started by a lit cigarette that was thrown aside.

Zodiac 
 On 22 September 2001, two teenagers sustained minor injuries when one support on a gondola broke on Zodiac; a HUSS Enterprise flat ride. The gondola repeatedly hit the decking at the bottom of the ride whilst the operator attempted to stop the ride. The incident was taken to court, where the judge criticised the length of time it took to shut down the ride after an abnormal noise had been noticed. Tussauds Group was fined £65,000 and ordered to pay an additional £35,000 in costs for failing to ensure the safety of persons not in its employment.

Stabbing
On 18 July 2020, a 26-year-old man suffered severe stab wounds to his stomach following an altercation on a bridge near the park entrance; which also caused the park to be briefly put in lockdown. Craig Harakh, 26, was initially charged with causing grievous bodily harm with intent, but later these charges were dropped. He was jailed for seven months for affray. The victim was discharged from the hospital shortly after the incident.

Tibidabo Amusement Park, Barcelona, Spain

Pèndol
 On 10 July 2010, a 15-year-old girl died and three other teenagers were injured when the mechanical arm of the Pèndol broke and the basket carrying the four teens fell onto a nearby ride.

Tivoli Friheden, Aarhus, Denmark

Cobra
 On 4 July 2008, four unidentified people were injured while riding the Cobra coaster. The ride vehicle broke in two, with the front part of the train falling to the ground.
 On 14 July 2022, two people were injured and 14-year-old girl died while riding the Cobra coaster. The rear carriage disconnected for an unknown reason causing fatal and serious injuries.

Tramore Amusement Park, Tramore, Ireland

Slingshot
 On 5 August 2002, a 16-year-old male employee of the park was struck and killed by the ride while it was in operation.

Ghost Train
 On 26 August 2006, a 22-year-old man died in an accident after he stood up in the ghost train car, fell out over the side, and broke his neck against the wall.

Walibi Holland  Biddinghuizen, Netherlands

Condor
On 5 July 1994, 15 riders suffered injuries when one of the trains collided into the other parked at the station. Six of the 40 passengers that were on board the ride were taken to a nearby hospital while others were treated at the park.

El Rio Grande
 On 24 July 2013, a 10-year-old girl was seriously injured when her foot got stuck on one of the boats. It was later reported by the police that once they rescued her, one of her feet was missing. The girl was taken to a nearby hospital and had her foot amputated. After the incident, many signs were put on the ride to ensure the safety of all guests.

Red Bull Kart Fight Exhibition Track
On 5 May 2018, a 13-year-old girl was severely injured in a karting incident. A part of the skin on her head was torn off after her hair was caught in the engine of the kart through an opening behind the seat.  Walibi Holland was prosecuted for a possible negligence on two points: the kart was missing a part guarding the drive belt, and the ride operators might have ignored safety instructions. The park was found not guilty because there was not enough evidence that the missing guard contributed to the accident, nor that there had been too few instructions on the part of the operators. Eyewitnesses also confirmed the hair had been tied in a knot when the girl left the station. The manufacturer of the karts criticized the absence of a helmet requirement which is in place for karting tracks but not for amusement parks. As of February 2021, she still had physical and psychological problems from the accident.

Wheelgate Park, Nottinghamshire, England

 On 5 September 2004 (then known as Wonderland Pleasure Park) on the Astroslide ride, a seven-year-old girl died after sustaining severe head injuries after falling to the ground while exiting the ride.

 On 16 April 2016, a 3-year-old boy fell unconscious while visiting the park with his parents. Paramedics tried to revive him, but he was pronounced dead after arriving at the hospital. It was stated that the boy was not on a ride at the park and had a health condition at the time of his death.

Wild- und Freizeitpark Klotten, Germany

Klotti-Achterbahn 
 On 6 August 2022 a 57-year-old woman fell eight metres from the moving roller coaster and died on the scene. The cause of the accident is currently being investigated. The district of Cochem-Zell prohibited the operation of the roller coaster until a safety check has been performed.

See also
 Amusement park accidents

References

European parks